Comitas abnormis is an extinct species of sea snail, a marine gastropod mollusc in the family Pseudomelatomidae, the turrids and allies.

Description

Distribution
This marine species is endemic to New Zealand. Fossils have been found in Tertiary strata of southern Wairarapa

References

 King, L. C. "Tertiary molluscan faunas from the southern Wairarapa." Transactions of the New Zealand Institute. Vol. 63. 1933.
 Maxwell, P.A. (2009). Cenozoic Mollusca. pp 232–254 in Gordon, D.P. (ed.) New Zealand inventory of biodiversity. Volume one. Kingdom Animalia: Radiata, Lophotrochozoa, Deuterostomia. Canterbury University Press, Christchurch.

External links
 
 Museum of New Zealand: Comitas abnormis

abnormis
Gastropods described in 1933
Gastropods of New Zealand